Yalıntaş  (former Mineviz) is a town in Bursa Province,  Turkey.

Geography 

Yalıntaş is in Mustafakemalpaşa district of Bursa Province. At  it is almost merged to Mustafakemalpaşa . The population of the town was 5539. as of 2012.

History
Yalıntaş was a colony of the Republic of Genoa in the Middle Ages, famed for its high quality kaolinite. After Italians left the settlement, the town became a Greek town both during the Byzantine and the Ottoman periods. After the population exchange between Greece and Turkey agreement in 1923, Greeks were replaced by Turks. In 1996, the settlement was declared a seat of township.

Economy
The economy of the town depends on agriculture. There are also sand quarries around the town.

Gallery

References  

Populated places in Bursa Province
Towns in Turkey
Mustafakemalpaşa